Dominique Vellard (born 1953) is a French tenor and specialist in medieval music. In 1979 he founded the Ensemble Gilles Binchois, a leading ensemble in the performance of Ars Nova music. He is also a composer.

Selected discography
Harmonic:
Gregorian Chant. Ensemble Gilles Binchois - Dominique Vellard Harmonic 8827 
 Les Escholiers de Paris - Motets, Chansons et Estampies du XIIIe siècle. Ensemble Gilles Binchois - Dominique Vellard Harmonic reissued Cantus Records: 
 Machaut: Messe de Notre Dame 
 Machaut: Le Jugement du Roi de Navarre Ballades, motets, virelais. Ensemble Gilles Binchois - Dominique Vellard Cantus 
Virgin Veritas:
 Jehan de Lescurel: Fontaine de grace Ballades, virelais et rondeaux Ensemble Gilles Binchois - Dominique Vellard Virgin Veritas 45066 
 Guillaume Dufay: Missa Ecce ancilla Domini Ensemble Gilles Binchois - Dominique Vellard Virgin Veritas 45050 
 Le Banquet du Voeu 1454. Ensemble Gilles Binchois - Dominique Vellard Virgin Veritas 59043 
 Le Manuscrit du Puy. Ensemble Gilles Binchois - Dominique Vellard Virgin Veritas 59238 
 Les premiers polyphonies française. Ensemble Gilles Binchois - Dominique Vellard, dir. Virgin Veritas 45135 
 El Misteri d'Elx. Ensemble Gilles Binchois - Dominique Vellard Virgin Veritas 45239 (2 CDs) 
 Sola m'ire Cancionero de Palacio. Ensemble Gilles Binchois - Dominique Vellard Virgin Veritas 45359 
 Gilles Binchois: chansons Mon souverain desir. Ensemble Gilles Binchois - Dominique Vellard Virgin Veritas 45285 
 Pedro de Escobar: Requiem Ensemble Gilles Binchois - Dominique Vellard Virgin Veritas 45328 
 Les trois Maries - Messe grégorienne de Pâques. Ensemble Gilles Binchois - Dominique Vellard Virgin Veritas 45398 
 Amour, Amours Florilège des chansons françaises de la Renaissance Ensemble Gilles Binchois - Dominique Vellard Virgin Veritas 45458 
Glossa Music:
 Music and Poetry in St Gallen - Sequences and tropes. Ensemble Gilles Binchois Dominique Vellard    
 Motets croisés Monteverdi, Heinrich Schütz, Leguay, Frescobaldi. Dominique Vellard :fr:Jean-Pierre Leguay    
 L'Arbre de Jessé Gregorian chant and medieval polyphony. Ensemble Gilles Binchois Dominique Vellard    
 Francisco de Peñalosa: Missa Nunca fué pena mayor. Les Sacqueboutiers Ensemble Gilles Binchois Dominique Vellard    
 L'Amor de Lohn Medieval songs of love and loss. Ensemble Gilles Binchois Dominique Vellard 
 Vellard: Vox nostra resonet New music for voices.  Ensemble Gilles Binchois Dominique Vellard  
 Trialogue - South Indian, Moroccan and European medieval traditions. :fr:Aruna Saïram Noureddine Tahiri Dominique Vellard    
 Indian Ragas and Medieval Song - Modal melodies from East to West. Dominique Vellard Ken Zuckerman Anindo Chatterjee Keyvan Chemirani

Other labels:
 Alexandre-Pierre-François Boëly (1785-1858) Temperaments
 Tientos Temperaments
 Palestrina DHM
 Manuscrit de Saint-Gall - Musique & Poésie du IXe siècle de  Dominique Vellard SCB 1997 
 Rodrigo de Ceballos Lamentations. Mass. Ensemble Gilles Binchois - Dominique Vellard Almaviva
 Pérotin and the school of Notre Dame, 1160-1245 Ensemble Gilles Binchois - Dominique Vellard Ambroisie 9947 
 Cantigas de Santa Maria Ensemble Gilles Binchois Ambroisie 9973

References

External links
 Dominique Vellard biography on Ensemble Gilles Binchois website
 VIAF

French composers
French male composers
1953 births
Living people
Place of birth missing (living people)